Julio César Estigarribia is a Paraguayan footballer who played for Lota Schwager in 2010.

Club career
Born in Asunción, Paraguay, Estigarribia played as a defender for Chilean club Lota Schwager during 2009. He scored a game-winning goal in Lota Schwager's 2009 Copa Chile fourth round victory against Fernández Vial.

References

External links
 

Living people
Paraguayan footballers
Paraguayan expatriate footballers
Lota Schwager footballers
Primera B de Chile players
Expatriate footballers in Chile
Association football defenders
1989 births